The 34th National Assembly of Quebec was the provincial legislature in Quebec, Canada that was elected in the 1989 Quebec general election and sat from November 28, 1989, to March 18, 1992; from March 19, 1992, to March 10, 1994; and from March 17, 1994, to June 14, 1994. The Quebec Liberal Party government was led by Robert Bourassa throughout most of the mandate except in the final months of the government prior to the 1994 elections, when Daniel Johnson Jr. succeeded Bourassa as Premier of Quebec.

Seats per political party

Member list

This was the list of members of the National Assembly of Quebec that were elected in the 1989 election:

Other elected MNAs

Other MNAs were elected in by-elections in this mandate

 Jean Filion, Parti Québécois, Montmorency, August 12, 1991 
 Pierre Bélanger, Parti Québécois, Anjou, January 20, 1992 
 Roger Bertrand, Parti Québécois, Portneuf, July 5, 1993 
 Serge Ménard, Parti Québécois, Laval-des-Rapides, December 13, 1993 
 Marcel Landry, Parti Québécois, Bonaventure, February 21, 1994 
 Bernard Brodeur, Quebec Liberal Party, Shefford, February 28, 1994

Cabinet Ministers

Bourassa Cabinet (1989-1994)

 Prime Minister and Executive Council President: Robert Bourassa
 Deputy Premier: Lise Bacon
 Agriculture, Fisheries and Food: Michel Pagé (1989–1992), Yvon Picotte (1992–1994), Robert Middlemiss (Delegate) (1989–1990), Yvon Vallières (1992–1994)
Agriculture, Fisheries and Food and Regional Development (Delegate): Yvon Vallières (1990–1992)
 Labor: Yves Séguin (1988–1989), André Bourbeau (1990), Normand Cherry (1990–1994)
 Workforce, Revenue Security and Professional Formation: André Bourbeau
 President of the Treasury Board, Administration and Public Office: Daniel Johnson Jr.
 Provisioning and Services: Robert Dutil
 Cultural Affairs: Lucienne Robillard (1989–1990), Liza Frulla (1990–1993)
 Culture: Liza Frulla (1993–1994)
 Cultural Communities and Immigration: Monique Gagnon-Tremblay
 Cultural Communities (Delegate): Normand Cherry
 Francophonie: Guy Rivard (1989–1992)
 Health and Social Services: Marc-Yvan Côté, Christos Sirros (Delegate) (1989–1990)
 Status of Women : Violette Trépanier
 Education: Claude Ryan (1989–1990), Michel Pagé (1990–1992), Lucienne Robillard (1990–1993)
 Superior Education and Science: Claude Ryan (1989–1990), Lucienne Robillard (1990–1993)
 Education and Science: Lucienne Robillard (1993–1994)
 Recreation, Hunting and Fishing: Gaston Blackburn
 Mines and Regional Development: Raymond Savoie (1989–1990)
 Indian Affairs: John Ciaccia (1989–1990), Christos Sirros (1990–1994)
 Transportation: Sam Elkas
 Transportation (Delegate): Yvon Vallières (1989–1990), Robert Middlemiss (1990–1994)
 Communications: Liza Frulla (1989–1990), Lawrence Cannon (1990–1994)
 Municipal Affairs: Yvon Picotte (1989–1990), Claude Ryan (1990–1994)
 Regional Affairs: Yvon Picotte (1992–1994)
 Environment: Pierre Paradis
 Energy and Resources: Lise Bacon
 Forests: Albert Côté
 Canadian Intergovernmental Affairs: Gil Rémillard
 International Affairs: John Ciaccia, Guy Rivard (Delegate) (1992–1994)
 Electoral reform: Marc-Yvan Côté
 Tourism: André Vallerand
 Justice: Gil Rémillard
 Public Safety: Sam Elkas (1989–1990), Claude Ryan (1990–1994)
 Finances:  Gérard D. Levesque (1989–1993), Monique Gagnon-Tremblay (1993–1994)
 Finances: (Delegate): Louise Robic
 Revenue: Yves Séguin (1989–1990), Gérard D. Levesque (1990), Raymond Savoie (1990–1994)
 Industry, Commerce and Technology: Gérald Tremblay

Johnson Jr. Cabinet (1994)

 Prime Minister and Executive Council President: Daniel Johnson Jr.
 Vice-President of the Executive Council: Monique Gagnon-Tremblay
 Agriculture, Fisheries and Food: Yvon Picotte
 Revenue Security: Violette Trépanier
 Employment: Serge Marcil
 President of the Treasury Board, Administration and Public Office: Monique Gagnon-Tremblay
 Government Services: Jean Leclerc
 Culture and Communications: Liza Frulla
 International Affairs, Cultural Communities and Immigration: John Ciaccia
 Health and Social Services: Lucienne Robillard
 Status of Women and Family: Violette Trépanier
 Education: Jacques Chagnon
 Indian Affairs: Christos Sirros
 Transportation: Normand Cherry, Gaston Blackburn (Delegate)
 Municipal Affairs:Claude Ryan
 Regional Affairs: Yvon Picotte
 Environment and Wildlife: Pierre Paradis
 Natural Resources: Christos Sirros
 Electoral reform: Roger Lefebvre
 Justice: Roger Lefebvre
 Public Safety: Robert Middlemiss
 Finances: André Bourbeau
 Revenue: André Vallerand
 Industry, Commerce, Science and Technology: Gérald Tremblay, Georges Farrah (Delegate)

New electoral districts

An electoral map reform was made in 1992 and the changes were in effect starting in the 1994 elections.

The following electoral districts were created:
 Bertrand (in the Laurentides region, unrelated to the previous Bertrand in the Montérégie region)
 Blainville
 Borduas
 Laurier-Dorion
 Marguerite-D'Youville
 Saint-Henri–Sainte-Anne
 Westmount–Saint-Louis

The following electoral districts disappeared:

 Bertrand (in the Montérégie region), unrelated to the new Bertrand (in the Laurentides region)
 Dorion
 Laurier
 Saint-Henri
 Saint-Louis
 Sainte-Anne
 Westmount

References
 1989 election results
 List of historical Cabinet Ministers

Notes

34